The Walkman effect refers to the way music listened to via headphones allows the user to gain more control over their environment.  It was coined by International Research Center for Japanese Studies Professor Shuhei Hosokawa in an article of the same name published in Popular Music in 1984.   While the term was named after the dominant portable music technology of the time, the Sony Walkman, it generically applies to all such devices and has been cited numerous times to refer to more current products such as the Apple iPod.

History

When Sony released the first Walkmans, they featured two headphone jacks and a "hotline" switch.  When pressed, this button activated a microphone and lowered the volume to enable those listening to have a conversation without removing their headphones.  Sony Chairman Akio Morita added these features to the design for fear the technology would be isolating. Although Morita "thought it would be considered rude for one person to be listening to his music in isolation", people bought their own units rather than share and these features were removed for later models.

Autonomy

The initial Walkman marketing campaign showcased the freedom it brought.  The first presentation to the press involved young people riding bikes and skateboarding while listening to Walkmans.  Hosokawa points to this ability to listen to music and do something else as making those experiences more pleasurable.  The Walkman, he says, is the "autonomy-of-the-walking-self."

Sony's vice president in charge of audio products said that Walkman's achievement was that it "provided listeners with a personal soundtrack to their lives", allowing its users "to make even the most boring daily activities interesting, adding a bit of personal style to everything they do."

University of Sussex Professor Michael Bull (aka "Professor iPod") argues that a personal stereo changes the way its user processes the world, allowing for greater confidence and control over personal experiences in space and time. From an interview in Wired: "People like to control their environment, and the iPod is the perfect way to manage your experience. Music is the most powerful medium for thought, mood and movement control." Basically, Bull describes how music empowers the listener because of what one is now enabled to do, which is to "inhabit" the space in which they move.  Controlling one's own space is the power of the Walkman effect, which then causes no dead air, giving the user more power through their music.

Urban strategy

The appeal of personal experience management seems to be strongest in cities.  As Hosokawa puts it, "To think about [the Walkman effect] is to reflect on the urban itself: [W]alkman as urban strategy, as urban sonic/musical device."  The very nature of an urban environment is such that the potential for chance encounters and unpredictable human interactions is omnipresent.  Whereas someone's attention is fair game while simply walking down the street, riding on the subway, or sitting on a bench to rest, one can appear busy and engaged when doing these activities while listening to music, making any attempt at communication effectively an interruption.  Those who might otherwise be willing to interrupt may be further deterred by the fact that there’s a good chance they won’t even be heard, rendering their effort futile or embarrassing.  Even if the interrupter is heard, it is easy for the listener to act as if they weren’t.  Headphones enable listeners to float through public areas in a protective bubble, actively tuning in or out who or what they want. 

One specific effect noted by both Patton and Bull is what Bull calls "auditized looking," the ability of those listening to a personal stereo to make or escape eye contact with others in ways they wouldn't otherwise.  Traditional messages carried by eye contact are, to some extent, dissolved by the music's protective bubble, with the listener seen as unavailable.

Controversy

The Walkman was the first of a long line of mobile devices to attract criticism for isolating its users, promoting narcissism, detachment, and rude behavior, while at the same time preventing interactions that are the basis for traditional place-based communities.

In his phenomenological analysis of this effect, Rainer Schönhammer argues that wearing headphones interrupts a form of contact between people in a shared situation, even if there's no explicit communication, thereby violating "an unwritten law of interpersonal reciprocity: the certainty of common sensual presence in shared situations."  He goes on to draw a similarity with the wearing of dark sunglasses, which irritates because there's an inequality in the balance of looking at and being looked at.  Similarly, according to Hosokawa, Walkman users blatantly "confess" that they have a secret (something that you can't hear), which can cause negative feelings in observers.

Both men, however, make an effort to counter negative accusations of detachment, isolation, and narcissism.  Perhaps most importantly, Walkman listeners are generally happier, more confident, and calmer.  The users are "unified in the autonomous and singular moment--neither as persons nor as individuals--with the real," when "absence does not mean that the world is no longer worth attention. On the contrary, the subject's disengagement sets him free to enjoy the world attentively as a colorful and rich spectacle."

See also

Networked individualism
Space of flows

References

Computing and society